Two ships of the United States Navy have borne the name Chevalier, in honor of the Lieutenant Commander Godfrey Chevalier, a pioneer of naval aviation.

Chevalier was transferred to South Korea in 1972, and renamed Chung Buk; she was scrapped in 2000.

United States Navy ship names